Sir Peter William Mathieson  (born 18 April 1959) is an English nephrologist and current principal and vice-chancellor of the University of Edinburgh. Previously, he served as the vice-chancellor and president of the University of Hong Kong (HKU). He was the dean of the Faculty of Medicine and Dentistry of the University of Bristol before he assumed office at the HKU in April 2014, and was previously director of studies at Christ's College, Cambridge.

Biography
Mathieson went to school in Penzance, Cornwall. He studied medicine at London Hospital Medical College and earned Bachelor of Medicine, Bachelor of Surgery with first class honours awarded from University of London in 1983. After junior posts in and around the West End of London, he went to Christ's College, Cambridge as a Medical Research Council (MRC) training fellow, studying for a PhD which was awarded in 1992. His thesis was titled "Role of T lymphocytes in autoimmune responses". While studying for his PhD, Mathieson also taught at Cambridge and was named 'Teacher of the Year' in 1992 by the university's medical students. Mathieson was awarded a second MRC fellowship during which he worked on complement/immunology with Douglas Fearon and Peter Lachmann. He was also Director of Studies for Clinical Medicine at Christ's College, Cambridge.

Career

University of Bristol
Mathieson joined the University of Bristol in 1995 as the foundation professor of renal medicine. He was also honorary consultant nephrologist with the North Bristol NHS Trust. In 1999 he was elected as a fellow of the Academy of Medical Sciences, United Kingdom. While at the University of Bristol, Mathieson ran 'The cellular basis of albuminuria' research project, with £585,000 funding from the MRC from 2005 to 2008. The project aimed to 'develop ways of detecting and treating early kidney and heart disease'. In 2007 he was elected as the youngest ever president of the Renal Association and also became head of the University Department of Clinical Science at North Bristol. He was also appointed as director of research & development for the North Bristol NHS Trust. Between 2003 and 2007 he chaired the Research Grants Committee of Kidney Research UK [formerly National Kidney Research Fund]. He was a member of the Renal Association Clinical Trials committee from 1996 to 2007 and its chairman between 2000 and 2003. In 2008 he was appointed dean of the Faculty of Medicine and Dentistry at the University of Bristol.

He was appointed Dean of the university's Faculty of Medicine and Dentistry in 2008. Foundation doctors at University Hospitals Bristol voted Mathieson as 'Top Teacher' for 2011–12. A further MRC-funded research project on treatment of patients with membranous nephropathy (a type of kidney disease) found a treatment which mitigated against deterioration; the results were published in The Lancet.

University of Hong Kong
In October 2013, Mathieson was appointed vice chancellor of the University of Hong Kong, replacing Lap-Chee Tsui. He was the first British person to be appointed the chancellor of HKU since Kenneth Robinson (excluding Ian Rees Davies, who succeeded after Cheng Yiu-chung's resignation). His appointment was controversial as some staff felt that Mathieson lacked management experience and familiarity with Chinese society. Leong Che-hung, who headed the committee that appointed Mathieson noted that he had experience running a faculty at the University of Bristol, while Mathieson himself suggested his unfamiliarity with China gave the opportunity for a fresh start.

His tenure at HKU was described to be full of "tension and clashes between the university's governing body and students". Five months into his vice-chancellorship, a students-led class boycott, protesting against Beijing authorities' decision of Hong Kong's suffrage, evolved into a 79-day occupy protest. During the crisis, he stated that independence was not a realistic political option for Hong Kong, but defended the rights of students to protest in favour of Hong Kong's democratic values.

In 2015, Mathieson was elected as an honorary fellow of Hughes Hall, University of Cambridge. That year, a University of Hong Kong panel led by Mathieson selected Johannes Chan as pro-vice-chancellor, however the appointment was blocked by the university's governing council. Chan is pro-democracy, supports human rights, and had supported the student occupy protest in 2014, and was unpopular with the government. The episode was viewed as an incident in which the university's academic freedom was under threat, and Mathieson's authority suffered as a result; in a staff survey, 78% of people did not feel Mathieson had "effectively protected academic freedom". Addressing the results of the survey, Mathieson acknowledged the unpopularity of some of his actions and questioned the survey's methodology.

On 2 February 2017, two years before the original expiry of his contract, Mathieson resigned from the post of HKU. Mathieson claimed that he was squeezed out of the position by HKU's Chairman of the Governing Council, Arthur Li. The Chairman of the Staff Association, William Cheung, stated "you may now appreciate why we thank you [University of Edinburgh] so many times for taking Professor Mathieson on board" after claims that Mathieson failed to uphold academic freedom, discouraged debate on campus, and did not understand the needs of students emerged from a staff survey. Addressing the results of the survey, Mathieson described the survey as flawed in its methodology.

University of Edinburgh
Mathieson became Principal and Vice-Chancellor of the University of Edinburgh in February 2018. He will be the highest paid figure in Scottish Higher Education with a benefits package exceeding £400,000. While the university said the salary was set in relation to vice chancellor pay at similar sized universities, it was criticised by the University and College Union during the UK-wide dispute between university staff and management over pensions. The £342,000 salary is less than Mathieson was paid at HKU. He has lectured to undergraduate medical students on his specialism in kidney disease at Edinburgh.

Research
According to Mathieson's profile on the University of Bristol website:

Honours
Mathieson was knighted in the 2023 New Year Honours for services to higher education.

References

External links

 Professor Peter Mathieson – School of Clinical Sciences
 Professor Peter Mathieson – President and Vice-Chancellor – Officers of the University – About HKU – HKU
 Professor Peter William Mathieson – CV

1959 births
Living people
Hong Kong scientists
Alumni of the University of London
Alumni of the London Hospital Medical College
Heads of universities in Hong Kong
Vice-Chancellors of the University of Hong Kong
Principals of the University of Edinburgh
Place of birth missing (living people)
Knights Bachelor
People from Penzance
British nephrologists